Nord-Frøya is a former municipality in the old Sør-Trøndelag county, Norway. The  municipality existed from 1906 until its dissolution in 1964. Nord-Frøya included the northern part of the island of Frøya and all of the small islands to the north and northeast such as Sula, Mausund, Froan, and Halten in what is now the municipality of Frøya in Trøndelag county. The main church for the municipality was Sletta Church (or Nord-Frøya Church) which is located at Svellingen (the administrative centre of the municipality) on the northern coast of the island.

History
The municipality was established on 1 January 1906 when the old municipality of Frøien was divided into two new municipalities: Sør-Frøya in the south (population: 2,091) and Nord-Frøya in the north (population: 3,972). During the 1960s, there were many municipal mergers across Norway due to the work of the Schei Committee. On 1 January 1964, the municipalities of Sør-Frøya (population: 2,208) and Nord-Frøya (population: 4,348) were merged to form the municipality of Frøya.

Name
The municipality is named after the island of Frøya. The prefix Nord- means "northern", literally meaning the northern part of Frøya. The second part of the name comes from Norse mythology. Although Frøya is a variant of the name of the Norse goddess Freyja, the Old Norse form of the name of the island was Frøy or Frey (the ending -a in the modern form is actually the definite article - so the meaning of Frøya is 'the Frøy'). Therefore, the name of the island probably has the same root as the name of the Norse god Freyr, brother to Freyja. The names originally were titles: "lord" or "lady". The oldest meaning of the common word was "(the one) in front; the foremost, the leading" and here in the sense "the island in front of Hitra". Until 1906, the island and municipality name was spelled Frøien (-en is the definite article in Danish-Norwegian).

Government
All municipalities in Norway, including Nord-Frøya, are responsible for primary education (through 10th grade), outpatient health services, senior citizen services, unemployment and other social services, zoning, economic development, and municipal roads. The municipality is governed by a municipal council of elected representatives, which in turn elects a mayor.

Municipal council
The municipal council  of Nord-Frøya was made up of 29 representatives that were elected to four year terms. The party breakdown of the final municipal council was as follows:

See also
List of former municipalities of Norway

References

Frøya, Trøndelag
Former municipalities of Norway
1906 establishments in Norway
1964 disestablishments in Norway